Sejakpur may refer to the following places in Gujarat, western India :

 Sejakpur, Jhalawar, a village and former minor princely state 
 present Ranpur, founded in 1194 as first capital of the Gohil Rajput Bhavnagar State